Baghlani Jadid is the main city of the district of  Baghlani Jadid, Baghlan Province, in north-central Afghanistan.  It is located in the valley of the Kunduz River, just east of the main Kunduz-Kabul all-weather highway.

See also 
Baghlan Province

Populated places in Baghlan Province